Granville Lake is an Indian settlement located on a peninsula on the south shore of Granville Lake (part of the Churchill River system) in northern Manitoba. The community is primarily a settlement of the Mathias Colomb First Nation, who now live in nearby Leaf Rapids.

The community does not have all-weather road access; rather the community relies on ice roads in the winter and the lake-river system in the summer.

In the 2006 census, Granville Lake had a population of 98 living in 16 dwellings, a 42.0% increase from 2001. In 2011, its population dropped to just 10 inhabitants, as the community shifted to Leaf Rapids.

References

External links
 Map of Granville Lake at Statcan

Hudson's Bay Company trading posts
Mining communities in Manitoba
Indian settlements in Manitoba
Unincorporated communities in Northern Region, Manitoba